Gaetano Gagliano  (August 24, 1917 – April 14, 2016) was an Italian-born Canadian entrepreneur who founded St. Joseph Communications and Salt + Light Television.

Career and family
Gagliano was born in Cattolica Eraclea, Sicily, on August 24, 1917, and immigrated to Toronto, Ontario, Canada in 1956. He first worked for the Canadian Pacific Railway before launching St. Joseph Communications which eventually became the largest private communications company in Canada. He and his wife, Giuseppina, had 10 children, including Tony. Gagliano died on April 14, 2016 at his home in Woodbridge, Ontario at the age of 98.

Honours
He was named a Knight of the Order of St. Sylvester in 1992, and a Member of the Order of Canada in 1998. He has received honorary doctorates from Canadian Universities.  In 2007, he was made a Commander (or Commendatore in Italian) of  the Order of the Star of Solidarity from the Government of Italy.

References

1917 births
2016 deaths
People from Cattolica Eraclea
Italian emigrants to Canada
Businesspeople from Sicily
Canadian Roman Catholics
Businesspeople from Ontario
Canadian printers
Knights of the Order of St. Sylvester
Members of the Order of Canada
Naturalized citizens of Canada